Plagiomimicus tepperi is a species of moth in the family Noctuidae (the owlet moths).

The MONA or Hodges number for Plagiomimicus tepperi is 9755.

References

Further reading

 
 
 

Amphipyrinae
Articles created by Qbugbot
Moths described in 1875